Diamond Tower/برج الماسة is a planned 93-story,  supertall skyscraper in Jeddah, Saudi Arabia whose construction was on hold until 2022 

Construction resumed on July 2022

The tower will be primarily for residential use. Once completed it will become Saudi Arabia's second-tallest building and one of the tallest residential buildings in the world. When completed, Diamond Tower will be the only building to twist a full 360 degrees along its height.

The first 12 floors will have the advantage of having a car park close to each flat; all cars will be lifted up by constructed ramps. The peak space of the tower will house 3 restaurants.

Construction

See also

 List of tallest buildings in Saudi Arabia
 List of tallest buildings in the world
 List of tallest residential buildings in the world
 List of twisted buildings
 List of future tallest buildings

References

External links
 Diamond Tower Page at CTBUH

Skyscrapers in Jeddah
Buildings and structures under construction in Saudi Arabia
Proposed buildings and structures in Saudi Arabia
Twisted buildings and structures